Arne Semb-Johansson (20 September 1919 – 22 February 2001) was a Norwegian zoologist. He was born in Kristiania. He chaired the Norwegian Entomological Society from 1950 to 1953. He was assigned as professor of zoology at the University of Oslo from 1959. Among his early works were studies of the nervous system and endocrine system of insects. He edited the six volume encyclopedia Cappelens Dyreleksikon, published 1979–1981. He was decorated Knight, First Class of the Order of St. Olav in 1987.

During the occupation of Norway by Nazi Germany he was a central member of Milorg, being a courier for leader Jens Christian Hauge. He was a member of the board of Norway's Resistance Museum from 1973. In 1995 he published the book Fem år for fred og frihet med Milorg 1940–1945.

References

1919 births
2001 deaths
Scientists from Oslo
20th-century Norwegian zoologists
Norwegian entomologists
Academic staff of the University of Oslo
Norwegian resistance members
Norwegian people of Swedish descent
Royal Norwegian Society of Sciences and Letters
Members of the Royal Swedish Academy of Sciences